The following is a list of awards and nominations received by American director, producer, and screenwriter Francis Ford Coppola.

Coppola is the winner of multiple film awards both nationally and internationally including Academy Awards for Patton. His movies The Godfather, The Godfather Part II and Apocalypse Now are often cited among the greatest films of all time.

Academy Awards

Best Picture

Best Director

Best Original Screenplay

Best Adapted Screenplay

British Academy Film Awards

Best Director

Best Screenplay

Best Music

Golden Globe Awards

Best Motion Picture – Drama

Best Motion Picture – Musical or Comedy

Best Director

Best Screenplay

Best Original Score

Cannes Film Festival

Palme d'Or

Directors Guild of America Award

Outstanding Directing – Feature Film

Primetime Emmy Award

Outstanding Limited Series

Writers Guild of America Award

Best American Screenplay – Comedy

Best Original Screenplay

Best Adapted Screenplay

Kansas City Film Critics Circle Award

Best Film

Best Director

Other awards

Major awards received by Coppola movies

Honors 
 He featured at No. 17 in MovieMaker magazine's 25 most influential directors of all-time.
 He also ranked No. 9 in TopTenReviews' list of top directors of all time and at No. 21 in Entertainment Weekly's top 50 directors of all time.
 Four of Coppola's films (The Godfather, The Godfather Part II, Apocalypse Now, and Patton) featured in the Writers Guild of America, West list of 101 greatest screenplays ever.
 Three of his films feature in AFI's 100 Years...100 Movies: The Godfather at #2, Apocalypse Now at #28, and The Godfather Part II at #32. The Godfather also ranks at No. 11 in AFI's 100 Years...100 Thrills. The following Coppola films were also nominated for the list: American Graffiti (1973) – Producer, The Conversation (1974) – Director/Producer/Screenwriter, and Patton (1970) – Screenwriter.
 In 1991, he was honored with the Berlinale Camera at the Berlin International Film Festival.
 In 1992, he was awarded a Golden Lion – Honorary Award at the Venice Film Festival. as well as the Inkpot Award at the annual San Diego Comic Con.
 In 1994, he received the Golden Plate Award of the American Academy of Achievement. His Golden Plate was presented by Awards Council member George Lucas.
 In 1998, the Directors Guild of America honored him with a Lifetime Achievement Award.
In the 2002 poll of the Sight & Sound publication, Coppola ranked No. 4 in the Directors' top ten directors of all time and No. 10 in the Critics' top ten directors of all time. In a separate poll by the same magazine Coppla was listed at No. 8 on the list of the top ten film directors of modern time.
 He was honored with a special 50th anniversary award for his impressive career at the 2002 San Sebastián International Film Festival.
 The same year he received a gala tribute from Film Society of Lincoln Center.
 In 2003, he was awarded a Lifetime Achievement Award at the Denver Film Festival.
 Coppola was ranked at No. 15 on Empire magazine's "Top 40 Greatest Directors of All-Time" list in 2005.
 He was given an honorary award at the 2007 Antalya Golden Orange Film Festival.
 In 2007, Total Film magazine ranked Coppola at No. 5 on its "100 Greatest Film Directors Ever" list.
 In 2010, the Academy of Motion Picture Arts and Sciences decided to honor him with the Irving G. Thalberg Memorial Award at the 2nd Governor's Awards in November. The honor was bestowed on him on November 13, along with honorary Oscars to Jean-Luc Godard, Kevin Brownlow and Eli Wallach.
 On October 16, 2013, he was awarded a Praemium Imperiale in the theater/film category.
 Coppola serves as the "Honorary Consul H. E. Francis Ford Coppola" in San Francisco for Belize.
 On October 1, 2014, Coppola was inducted into the California Hall of Fame by Governor Edmund G. "Jerry" Brown Jr.
 Coppola is among only six people in Academy Award history to receive Oscars as a producer, director and screenwriter.
 On May 6, 2015, he was awarded the Princess of Asturias Award for the Arts, in Oviedo.
 On December 5, 2015, he was decorated with Gold Medal of the Order of Intellectual Efficience of Morocco, in Marrakech.
 In 2019 he was awarded the Lumière Award for contribution to film in Lumière Film Festival, France.
 On March 21, 2022, he was honored with a star on the Hollywood Walk of Fame.
 He is an honorary member of Phi Beta Kappa through Hofstra University.

References 

Francis Ford Coppola
Lists of awards received by film director
Lists of awards received by writer